This page details football records in Algeria.

Most successful clubs overall

External links
Algeria - List of Champions - rsssf
Algeria - List of Cup Finals - rsssf

Football in Algeria
Algeria